The 2015–16 season will be Alloa Athletic's third consecutive season back in the second tier of Scottish football and their third season in the Scottish Championship, having been promoted through playoffs from the Scottish Second Division at the end of the 2012–13 season. Alloa will also compete in the Challenge Cup, League Cup and the Scottish Cup.

Results & fixtures

Scottish Championship

Scottish Challenge Cup

League Cup

Scottish Cup

Player statistics

Squad 
Last updated 26 March 2016

|}

Team statistics

League table

Division summary

Transfers

Players in

Players out

See also
List of Alloa Athletic F.C. seasons

References

Alloa Athletic
2015andndash;16